Geno DeMarco is an American football coach and former player.  He is the current head football coach at Geneva College in Beaver Falls, Pennsylvania, a position he has held since 1993.

Head coaching record

References

External links
 Geneva profile
 Geneva College faculty profile

Year of birth missing (living people)
Living people
American football linebackers
Geneva Golden Tornadoes football coaches
Geneva Golden Tornadoes football players
Georgia Tech Yellow Jackets football coaches
West Virginia Mountaineers football coaches
West Virginia University alumni